Stare Selo, literally "Old Village", until 2016 – Chervone, or simply Stare, is a village in Ukraine, in Sumy Raion, Sumy Oblast. It is the seat of its local self-governing body, Starosiljskiy Village Council.

Location
The village of Stare is located on the right bank of the Psel River, 9 km south of central Sumy. Above the village at a distance of 1 km is the village of Barvinkove, below the village at a distance of 2 km is the village of Vyshneve. The Psel in this place is winding, forms swamps, and marshes. Nearby is highway H12.

History
Founded in 1642 as "Stare Selo".
In the 19th century, the village of Stare Selo was in Sumskaya Volostj, Sumskoy Uyezd, Kharkivskaya Guberniya. The Nikolaev Church was built in the village.
 In 1930 it was renamed "Chervone" by Russian patriots.
 In 2016 it was given back its original name, Stare Selo.

Transport
Stare has two bus stops: one at the highway and Sumska Street, and another on Pershotravneva Street and Sumska Street. Marshrutkas from Sumy and other villages run to and by the village frequently.

References

External links
Timetable of marshrutkas to and from Stare Selo
Weather in Stare Selo
Villages in Sumy Raion